Mehtar may refer to :

 Mehtar, a rare and obsolete title for a ruler in the Northwest Frontier region, notably in the following princely states:
 Chitral (princely state), from before 1700 
 Yasin State, from 1892 

 Places
 Mehtar, Lorestan, a village in Iran
 Mehtar, Zanjan, a village in Iran

 Other 

 Mehtar, an alternative name for the Indo-Aryan Domari language, spoken by older Dom people scattered across the Middle East and North Africa
 Mehtar, another name for the Hela and Hela Mehtar communities of India

See also 
 Hesar Mehtar (disambiguation)